This is a partial list of species in Longitarsus, a genus of flea beetles in the family Chrysomelidae.

Selected species

 Longitarsus absynthii Kutschera, 1862 g
 Longitarsus acutipennis Blatchley, 1924 i c g
 Longitarsus aeneicollis (Faldermann, 1837) g
 Longitarsus aeneolus Blatchley, 1923 i c g
 Longitarsus aeneus (Kutschera, 1862) g
 Longitarsus aeruginosus (Foudras, 1860)
 Longitarsus agilis (Rye, 1868) g
 Longitarsus albineus (Foudras, 1859)
 Longitarsus albus (Allard, 1866) g
 Longitarsus alfierii Pic, 1923 g
 Longitarsus allotrophus
 Longitarsus alternatus (Ziegler, 1845) i c g
 Longitarsus anacardius (Allard, 1866) g
 Longitarsus anatolicus
 Longitarsus anchusae (Paykull, 1799) g
 Longitarsus andalusicus Gruev, 1973 g
 Longitarsus angelikae
 Longitarsus angorensis
 Longitarsus apicalis (Beck, 1817) g
 Longitarsus aramaicus Leonardi, 1979 g
 Longitarsus arenaceus Blatchley, 1921 i c g b
 Longitarsus arisanus Chujo, 1937 g
 Longitarsus artvinus Gruev & Aslan, 1998
 Longitarsus atricillus (Linnaeus, 1761) g
 Longitarsus aubozaorum
 Longitarsus audisioi
 Longitarsus australis (Mulsant & Rey, 1874)
 Longitarsus baeticus Leonardi, 1979 g
 Longitarsus ballotae (Marsham, 1802) g
 Longitarsus barbarae Doguet & Bergeal, 2001 g
 Longitarsus bedeli Uhagon, 1887 g
 Longitarsus behnei Gruev & Arnold, 1989 g
 Longitarsus belgaumensis Jacoby
 Longitarsus bergeali Doguet & Gruev, 1988
 Longitarsus bertii Leonardi, 1973 g
 Longitarsus bethae  g
 Longitarsus bicolor Horn, 1889 i c g
 Longitarsus bicoloriceps Chjuo, 1937 g
 Longitarsus bonnairei (Allard, 1866)
 Longitarsus borisi Konstantinov, 2005
 Longitarsus brachypterus
 Longitarsus bremondi
 Longitarsus brevipennis Wollaston, 1860 g
 Longitarsus brisouti Heikertinger, 1912
 Longitarsus brunneus (Duftschmid, 1825) g
 Longitarsus bulgaricus Gruev, 1973 g
 Longitarsus bytinskii
 Longitarsus caroli
 Longitarsus californicus (Motschulsky, 1845) i c g
 Longitarsus callidus Warchalowski, 1967
 Longitarsus candidulus (Foudras, 1860)
 Longitarsus celticus Leonardi, 1975
 Longitarsus cerinthes (Schrank, 1798) g
 Longitarsus chujoi Csiki, 1939 g
 Longitarsus cinerariae Wollaston, 1854 g
 Longitarsus cizeki Döberl, 2004
 Longitarsus codinai Madar & Madar, 1965 g
 Longitarsus corpulentus
 Longitarsus corynthius (Reiche & Saulcy, 1858)
 Longitarsus cotulus Blatchley, 1914 i c g
 Longitarsus croaticus Gruev, 1975 g
 Longitarsus curtus (Allard, 1860) g
 Longitarsus cyanipennis Bryant, 1924 g
 Longitarsus danieli Mohr, 1962 g
 Longitarsus danilevskyi Konstantinov, 2005
 Longitarsus debernardii
 Longitarsus dlabolai
 Longitarsus dorsalis (Fabricius, 1781) g
 Longitarsus echii (Koch, 1803) g
 Longitarsus emarginatus
 Longitarsus eminatus
 Longitarsus eminus Warchałowski, 1967
 Longitarsus erro Horn, 1889 i c g b
 Longitarsus exsoletus (Linnaeus, 1758) g
 Longitarsus fallax Weise, 1888
 Longitarsus ferrugineus (Foudras in Mulsant, 1859) i c g b
 Longitarsus ferruginipennis Fuente, 1910 g
 Longitarsus flavicornis (Stephens, 1831) i c g
 Longitarsus formosanus Chujo, 1937 g
 Longitarsus foudrasi Weise, 1893
 Longitarsus fowleri Allen, 1967 g
 Longitarsus frontosus Normand, 1947 g
 Longitarsus fulgens (Foudras, 1860) g
 Longitarsus fuliginosus (Broun, 1880) g
 Longitarsus fuscicornis Blatchley, 1919 i c g
 Longitarsus fuscoaeneus Redtenbacher, 1849 g
 Longitarsus ganglbaueri Heikertinger, 1912 i c g b
 Longitarsus gilli Gruev & Askevold
 Longitarsus girardi
 Longitarsus gloriae
 Longitarsus gomerensis Biondi, 1986 g
 Longitarsus gracilis Kutschera, 1864 g
 Longitarsus gruevi Leonardi & Mohr, 1974
 Longitarsus helvolus Kutschera, 1863 g
 Longitarsus hermonensis
 Longitarsus hittita
 Longitarsus hohuanshanus Kimoto, 1970 g
 Longitarsus holsaticus (Linnaeus, 1758) g
 Longitarsus huberi LeSage, 1988 i c g
 Longitarsus ibericus Leonardi & Mohr, 1974 g
 Longitarsus iconiensis
 Longitarsus idilphilus
 Longitarsus igori Konstantinov, 2005
 Longitarsus impuncticollis Blatchley, 1923 i c g
 Longitarsus inconspicuus Wollaston, 1860 g
 Longitarsus insolens Horn, 1889 i c g
 Longitarsus ishikawai Kimoto, 1970 g
 Longitarsus isoplexidis Wollaston, 1854 g
 Longitarsus jacobaeae (Waterhouse, 1858) i c g b  (ragwort flea beetle)
 Longitarsus jailensis Heikertinger, 1913 g
 Longitarsus jandiensis Biondi, 1986 g
 Longitarsus juncicola (Foudras, 1860)
 Longitarsus karlheinzi Warchalowski, 1972 g
 Longitarsus khnsoriani
 Longitarsus kippenbergi
 Longitarsus kleiniiperda Wollaston, 1860 g
 Longitarsus kopdagiensis
 Longitarsus kutscherae (Rye, 1872) g
 Longitarsus languidus Kutschera, 1863 g
 Longitarsus latens
 Longitarsus lateripunctatus (Rosenhauer, 1856)
 Longitarsus laureolae Biondi, 1988 g
 Longitarsus lederi
 Longitarsus ledouxi
 Longitarsus leonardii Doguet, 1973
 Longitarsus lewisii Baly, 1874 g
 Longitarsus limnophilae Prathapan & Viraktamath, 2011
 Longitarsus linnaei (Duftschmid, 1825)
 Longitarsus liratus Maulik
 Longitarsus livens J. L. LeConte, 1858 i c g
 Longitarsus longipennis Kutschera, 1864 g
 Longitarsus longiseta Weise, 1889 g
 Longitarsus luridus (Scopoli, 1763) i c g b
 Longitarsus lycopi (Foudras, 1860) g
 Longitarsus malandensis Weise, 1923
 Longitarsus mancus J. L. LeConte, 1858 i c g
 Longitarsus manfredi
 Longitarsus medvedevi Shapiro, 1956 g
 Longitarsus melanocephalus (De Geer, 1775) g
 Longitarsus melanurus (F. E. Melsheimer, 1847) i c g b
 Longitarsus membranaceus (Foudras, 1860) g
 Longitarsus meridionalis
 Longitarsus messerschmidtiae Wollaston, 1860 g
 Longitarsus minimus Kutschera, 1863 g
 Longitarsus minusculus (Foudras, 1860) g
 Longitarsus mirei
 Longitarsus misellus Blatchley, 1921 i c g
 Longitarsus monticola Kutschera, 1863 g
 Longitarsus montivagus Horn, 1889 i c g
 Longitarsus morrisonus Chujo, 1937 g
 Longitarsus nadiae  g
 Longitarsus nakanei Kimoto, 1970 g
 Longitarsus nanus (Foudras, 1860) g
 Longitarsus nasturtii (Fabricius, 1792) g
 Longitarsus nebulosus (Allard, 1866)
 Longitarsus nemethi
 Longitarsus nervosus Wollaston, 1854 g
 Longitarsus niger (Koch, 1803) g
 Longitarsus nigerrimus (Gyllenhal, 1827) g
 Longitarsus nigrilividus
 Longitarsus nigrocephalus R. White, 1985 i c g
 Longitarsus nigrocillus (Motschulsky, 1849)
 Longitarsus nigrofasciatus (Goeze, 1777) g
 Longitarsus nimrodi Furth, 1979 g
 Longitarsus nitidellus Cockerell, 1888 i c g
 Longitarsus noricus Leonardi, 1976 g
 Longitarsus nubigena Wollaston, 1854 g
 Longitarsus obliteratoides Gruev, 1973
 Longitarsus obliteratus (Rosenhauer, 1847) g
 Longitarsus occidentalis Horn, 1889 i c g
 Longitarsus ochroleucus (Marsham, 1802) g
 Longitarsus onosmae
 Longitarsus ordinatus (Foudras, 1860) g
 Longitarsus oregonensis Horn, 1889 i c g
 Longitarsus pallescens Blatchley, 1924 i c g
 Longitarsus palliatus
 Longitarsus pallidicornis Kutschera, 1863
 Longitarsus pardoi Doguet, 1974
 Longitarsus parvulus (Paykull, 1799) g
 Longitarsus pellucidus (Foudras in Mulsant, 1859) i c g b
 Longitarsus perforatus Horn, 1889 i c g
 Longitarsus persimilis Wollaston, 1860 g
 Longitarsus personatus Weise, 1893
 Longitarsus petitpierrei Bastazo, 1997 g
 Longitarsus peyerimhoffi (Abeille, 1909) g
 Longitarsus picicollis Weise, 1900 g
 Longitarsus pinguis Weise, 1888 g
 Longitarsus plantagomaritimus Dollman, 1912 g
 Longitarsus postremus Horn, 1889 i c g
 Longitarsus pratensis (Panzer, 1794) i c g b
 Longitarsus pubescens
 Longitarsus pulmonariae Weise, 1893 g
 Longitarsus pygmaeus Horn, 1889 i c g
 Longitarsus quadriguttatus (Pontoppidan, 1763) i c g b
 Longitarsus queenslandicus Csiki, 1939
 Longitarsus rangoonensis Jacoby
 Longitarsus ratshensis
 Longitarsus rectilineatus (Foudras, 1860)
 Longitarsus refugiensis Leonardi & Mohr, 1974 g
 Longitarsus reichei (Allard, 1860) g
 Longitarsus repandus J. L. LeConte, 1858 i c g
 Longitarsus rubellus (Foudras, 1860) g
 Longitarsus rubiginosus (Foudras in Mulsant, 1859) i c g b
 Longitarsus rufescens Horn, 1889 i c g
 Longitarsus rutilus (Illiger, 1807) g
 Longitarsus salarius
 Longitarsus saltatus Blatchley, 1921 i c g
 Longitarsus salviae Gruev, 1975
 Longitarsus sari Maulik
 Longitarsus saulicus
 Longitarsus scaphidioides Abeille, 1896 g
 Longitarsus scrobipennis Heikertinger, 1913 g
 Longitarsus scutellaris (Rey, 1847)
 Longitarsus sencieri (Allard, 1860) g
 Longitarsus serrulatus  g
 Longitarsus solaris Gruev, 1977 g
 Longitarsus solidaginis Horn, 1889 i c g
 Longitarsus springeri Leonardi, 1975 g
 Longitarsus stragulatus (Foudras, 1860) g
 Longitarsus strigicollis Wollaston, 1864
 Longitarsus subcylindricus Blatchley, 1920 i c g
 Longitarsus submaculatus Kutschera, 1863 g
 Longitarsus subrufus J. L. LeConte, 1859 i c g b  (marbleseed flea beetle)
 Longitarsus substriatus Kutschera, 1863 g
 Longitarsus succineus (Foudras in Mulsant, 1859) i c g b
 Longitarsus suspectus Blatchley, 1921 i c g b
 Longitarsus suturatus (Foudras, 1860)
 Longitarsus suturellus (Duftschmid, 1825)
 Longitarsus symphyti Heikertinger, 1912 g
 Longitarsus tabidus (Fabricius, 1775) g
 Longitarsus taiwanicus Chen, 1934 g
 Longitarsus tantulus (Foudras, 1860)
 Longitarsus tarraconensis Leonardi, 1979 g
 Longitarsus tenuicornis Blatchley, 1923 i c g
 Longitarsus testaceus (F. E. Melsheimer, 1847) i c g b
 Longitarsus thymalearum
 Longitarsus tmetopterus Jacobson g
 Longitarsus traductus Horn, 1889 i c g
 Longitarsus trepidus
 Longitarsus tristis Weise, 1888 g
 Longitarsus truncatellus Weise, 1890 g
 Longitarsus tunetanus Csiki, 1940 g
 Longitarsus turbatus Horn, 1889 i c g b
 Longitarsus vanus Horn, 1889 i c g
 Longitarsus varicornis Suffrian, 1868 i c g b
 Longitarsus velai Bastazo, 1997 g
 Longitarsus ventricosus
 Longitarsus victoriensis Blackburn, 1896
 Longitarsus vilis Wollaston, 1864 g
 Longitarsus violentoides
 Longitarsus violentus Weise, 1893 g
 Longitarsus waltherhorni Csiki, 1934 g
 Longitarsus warchalowskianus Furth, 2007 g
 Longitarsus warchalowskii Scherer, 1969 g
 Longitarsus weisei
 Longitarsus zangherii Warchalowski, 1968 g

Data sources: i = ITIS, c = Catalogue of Life, g = GBIF, b = Bugguide.net

References

Longitarsus